Also not to be confused with his son, Bernard Francis Hoppner Meyer (20 April 1811-3 June 1888), also an artist.

Henry Meyer  (12 June 1780 - 28 May 1847) was an English portrait painter, more known as a stipple and mezzotint engraver.

Meyer was born John Meyer in London - a son of John Meyer and Anna Torade Hoppner who married at St James Westminster 22 December 1767.  Contrary to other accounts Henry Meyer's father was a hairdresser and not an engraver. Joseph Farington recorded that Henry Meyer was a nephew of John Hoppner, referring to him as 'Mier' (8 February 1810), and in the obituary of Meyer in Gentleman's Magazine (1847 ii 665).

A prominent early 19th-century artist, Henry Meyer was admitted as a pupil to Christ's Hospital, London in 1791 where he studied under Benjamin Green. On 25 August 1794 he was apprenticed to Benjamin Smith for seven years and ultimately trained in engraving techniques at the Royal Academy Schools under Francesco Bartolozzi.

His first published engravings appeared in the early 19th century attributed to J. H. Meyer, he later dropped the J and most of his works were published under the name Henry Meyer or H. Meyer.  In the ensuing years he showed his skill at portraits and decorative subjects. He produced engravings of such notables as Lady Hamilton, Admiral Nelson, Sir John Nicholl, Lord Hawkesbury, Lord Byron, and Giuseppe Ambrogetti. His painting of Charles Lamb was hung in the India Office for many years. He was a founding member of the Society of British Artists, exhibiting many of his works with this association between 1824 and 1830, and acting as its president in 1828/9.

Bernard Francis Hoppner Meyer
Meyer is not to be confused with his son Bernard Francis Hoppner Meyer (20 April 1811 – 3 June 1888) who, also as an artist and engraver, published his work under the name Hoppner Meyer.  Hoppner Meyer emigrated to America in 1830.  By adopting this name later accounts have unfortunately confused these two artists including the misconception that his father Henry was the artist who painted President Andrew Jackson.  Henry Meyer should also not be confused with another son, Henry Meyer who was born 24 July 1817 and died no later than 1871 and most probably in 1866.  Henry Meyer (b1817), also an artist and engraver, is likely to have adopted the name Henry Hoppner Meyer in later life to further his career adding to the confusion over Henry Meyer's name.  All contemporary accounts establish that Henry Meyer never published his work under the name Henry Hoppner Meyer in his lifetime.

References

External links

 A engraving of a painting entitled  for Fisher's Drawing Room Scrap Book, 1832, with a poetical illustration by Letitia Elizabeth Landon.
 A engraving of a painting entitled  for Fisher's Drawing Room Scrap Book, 1832, with a poetical illustration by Letitia Elizabeth Landon.
National Portrait Gallery
Henry Meyer (biographical details), The British Museum

1780 births
1847 deaths
English engravers
19th-century English painters
English male painters
Painters from London
Members of the Royal Society of British Artists
19th-century English male artists